Hotel Silken Puerta América is a luxury Silken Hotel in Madrid, Spain. The exterior was designed by Jean Nouvel. The hotel's most defining characteristic is the design of each floor by a different architectural firm, including those of Norman Foster, Zaha Hadid, Ron Arad and Arata Isozaki.

List of architects 
Along with the exterior design by Nouvel, each floor was designed by a different architectural firm:

 Parking: Teresa Sapey
 Ground floor/lobby: John Pawson
 Floor 1: Zaha Hadid
 Floor 2: Norman Foster
 Floor 3: David Chipperfield
 Floor 4: Plasma Studio (Eva Castro) and Holger Kehne
 Floor 5: Victorio & Lucchino
 Floor 6: Marc Newson
 Floor 7: Ron Arad
 Floor 8: Kathryn Findlay
 Floor 9: Richard Gluckman
 Floor 10: Arata Isozaki
 Floor 11: Javier Mariscal and Fernando Salas
 Floor 12: Jean Nouvel

The restaurant was designed by Christian Liaigre, the bar by Marc Newson, and illumination of the hotel was carried out by Jason Bruges and Arnold Chan.

References

External links
Hotel Silken website

Hotels in Madrid
Buildings and structures in Chamartín District, Madrid
Hotels established in 2005
Hotel buildings completed in 2005